Rufford is a civil parish in the West Lancashire district of Lancashire, England.  It contains ten buildings that are recorded in the National Heritage List for England as designated listed buildings.  Of these, one is listed at Grade I, the highest of the three grades, and the others are at Grade II, the lowest grade.  The parish contains the villages of Rufford and Holmeswood, as well as the surrounding countryside.  The most important building in the parish is Rufford Old Hall; this and associated structures are listed.  The Rufford Branch of the Leeds and Liverpool Canal passes through the parish and a lock on it is listed.  The other listed buildings include houses, a church and a cross base in the churchyard, and a public house.


Key

Buildings

References

Citations

Sources

Lists of listed buildings in Lancashire
Buildings and structures in the Borough of West Lancashire